It Can't Last Forever is a 1937 American comedy film directed by Hamilton MacFadden and starring Ralph Bellamy, Betty Furness, and Robert Armstrong. It is also the debut film for an unbilled 11-year-old Donald O'Connor, who would later go on to be famous for his acrobatic tap dancing.

Cast 
 Ralph Bellamy as Russ Matthews
 Betty Furness as Carol Wilson
 Robert Armstrong as Al Tinker
 Raymond Walburn as Dr. Fothergill
 Thurston Hall as Fulton
 Edward Pawley as Cronin
 Wade Boteler as Police Captain Rorty
 Charles Judels as Mr. Appadelius
 George Chesebro as Studs 
 Marc Lawrence as Hoodlum
 unbilled players include Dorothy Dandridge, Paul Fix and Donald O'Connor

References

Bibliography
 Etling, Laurence. Radio in the Movies: A History and Filmography, 1926-2010. McFarland & Company, 2014.

External links 
 

1937 films
American black-and-white films
Columbia Pictures films
Films directed by Hamilton MacFadden
1930s crime comedy films
American crime comedy films
1937 comedy films
1930s English-language films
1930s American films